Herbert Cecil Pugh,  (2 November 1898 – 5 July 1941), usually called Cecil Pugh, was a Congregational Church minister and is the only clergyman to have received the George Cross. He was a South African who served in the First World War as a South African Army medical orderly and in the Second World War as a Royal Air Force chaplain. Pugh died in 1941 by remaining aboard a sinking troop ship to minister to trapped and wounded military personnel.

Life

Pugh was the second of seven children of Harry Walter and Jane (Douglas) Pugh. He was born in 1898 in Johannesburg and attended Jeppe High School for Boys. In the First World War in 1917–19 he was a medical orderly in France with the South African Field Ambulance.

After the war Pugh went to England, studied at Mansfield College, Oxford 1920–24 and became a Congregational clergyman. He was in civilian ministry at Camberley Congregational Church 1924–27 and then at Christ Church, Friern Barnet, Middlesex 1927–39. Pugh married Amy Lilian Tarrant and they had three children: sons Geoffrey and Alastair and daughter Fiona.

RAF service
When the Second World War broke out in 1939 Pugh became an RAF Chaplain, with the rank of Squadron Leader. He served at RAF Bridgnorth in Shropshire until 1941, when he was then posted to Takoradi on the Gold Coast. His passage to Takoradi was to be via a voyage on the troop ship  to Freetown, Sierra Leone.

Anselm was a cargo and passenger liner that had been converted into a troop ship by designating her passenger accommodation as officers' quarters and turning her holds into accommodation for other ranks. She had capacity for about 500 troops but on this occasion was heavily overloaded with about 1,200 British Army, Royal Marines and RAF personnel. There were 175 RAF personnel, on their way to serve in the North African Campaign.

On 5 July the  torpedoed Anselm about 300 miles north of the Azores. The explosion caused extensive damage below decks, where collapsed overheads and wrecked ladders injured or trapped many of the men in one of the converted holds. One survivor states that officers got away in boats from Anselms stern without waiting to help their men. Pugh, however, remained aboard, tending the wounded and helping to launch lifeboats and liferafts.

As Anselms bow settled lower in the water, Pugh turned his attention to his fellow-airmen injured and trapped in one of the converted holds. He told some Royal Marines to lower him on a rope into the hold, insisting "Where my men are, I have to be". The Marines tried to dissuade him, but Pugh insisted "My love of God is greater than my fear of death" so they did as he insisted. Once in the hold he knelt to pray with the trapped men, with seawater already up to his shoulders.

Anselm sank 22 minutes after she was hit. Pugh was not seen again.

George Cross
Pugh's actions profoundly affected some of the 1,060 survivors. One at first thought his self-sacrifice had been "silly", but then recognised his bravery as an example. Other airmen and soldiers praised Pugh's "bravery" and "sacrifice".

Anselms survivors went on to serve in the North African and Italian campaigns. As they returned to Britain after the war, their recollections of Pugh started to appear in the News of the World and the Daily Express. In 1947 his bravery was honoured with the George Cross, which King George VI presented to his widow Amy Pugh and Alastair Pugh, one of his sons, at Buckingham Palace.

At RAF Bridgnorth Pugh's example continued to be remembered until the station closed in 1963.

Pugh's George Cross citation states:
The Reverend H. C. Pugh, after seeing service in this country, was posted to Takoradi and embarked on H.M.T. Anselm, carrying over 1,300 passengers; for West Africa at the end of June, 1941. She was torpedoed in the Atlantic in the early hours of the 5 July 1941. One torpedo hit a hold on Deck C, destroying the normal means of escape. Mr. Pugh came up on deck in a dressing gown and gave all the help he could. He seemed to be everywhere at once, doing his best to comfort the injured, helping with the boats and rafts (two of these were rendered unserviceable as a result of the explosion) and visiting the different lower sections where men were quartered.

When he learned that a number of injured airmen were trapped in the damaged hold, he insisted on being lowered into it with a rope. Everyone demurred because the hold was below the water line and already the decks were awash and to go down was to go to certain death. He simply explained that he must be where his men were. The deck level was already caving in and the hold was three parts full of water so that, when he knelt to pray, the water reached his shoulders. Within a few minutes the ship plunged and sank and Mr. Pugh was never seen again. He had every opportunity of saving his own life but, without regard for his own safety and in the best tradition of the Service and of a Christian minister, he gave up his life for others."

A photograph of Pugh, alongside his GC citation, is displayed at the Armed Forces Chaplaincy Centre, Amport House.

A blue plaque on a house in East Castle Street, Bridgnorth, notes his residence there during his ministry at RAF Bridgnorth and his honour.

An inscription in the chapel of Mansfield College, Oxford commemorates alumni killed in the Second World War, including Pugh.

See also
 The Four Chaplains — United States Army chaplains who gave their lives in similar circumstances in 1943
 Tim Vakoc (1960–2009)  – US Army chaplain severely wounded in Iraq in 2004

References

Sources

External links
 
 

1898 births
1941 deaths
20th-century Congregationalist ministers
Alumni of Mansfield College, Oxford
Royal Air Force personnel killed in World War II
People from Johannesburg
People lost at sea
Royal Air Force chaplains
Royal Air Force recipients of the George Cross
South African Congregationalist ministers
South African military chaplains
South African recipients of the George Cross
World War II chaplains
South African military personnel of World War I
Royal Air Force Volunteer Reserve personnel of World War II
Royal Air Force squadron leaders
South African Army personnel